"Sub pielea mea" (English: Under My Skin) is a song recorded by Moldovan band Carla's Dreams. The song was released on 20 January 2016 and it is part of the third album of the band "NGOC".

The song reached number 1 in Romania and Russia. Also, it became the best-selling track in the Russian segment of iTunes and Apple Music by the end of 2016.

The song was nominated for the Radio Romania 2017 Music Award in the “Song of the Year” category.

Title

The word #Eroina, which is also part of the title of the song, is repeated multiple times in the chorus of the song. The word "Eroina" itself translates as "heroine", but according to Amalgama, it can also be translated as "heroin" due to its complete consonance with the word "heroina" and similarity in the meaning of the text.

Music video

The video footage took place in Chisinau, in a theater room directed by Roman Burlaca. The video features Moldovan actor, Cristian Perepeliuc, and the girlfriend of director Roman Burlaca. The video presents the protagonists in hypostases that would suggest love scenes. The video begins with the two protagonists dressed as nerd students waiting for the elevator where the band's frontman is. They climb into the elevator and then descend and arrive in a room similar to a bedroom where they undress. Throughout the clip the protagonists are presented in all sorts of situations that would be similar to the love parties. The video ends with the soloist and the protagonists in the elevator satisfied, looking at each other and smiling at the camera. In other scenes of the video, the frontman is singing and dancing in the respective elevator is also presented.
The video was uploaded to the band's YouTube channel Carla's Dreams and currently has over 86,000,000 views, being the most watched video of the band at this time.

The clip is inspired by scenes from the movie Fifty Shades of Grey (film). The site of the Romanian radio station Europa FM wrote that the eroticism of this clip attracted such attention of the audience.

Releases

Charts

Weekly charts

Year-end charts

See also
List of Airplay 100 number ones of the 2010s

References

2016 singles
2016 songs
Moldovan songs
Romanian songs
Torch songs
Number-one singles in Romania
Number-one singles in Russia
Obscenity controversies in music
Music video controversies
Songs written by Alexandru Cotoi